The Nature Index is a database that tracks institutions and countries and their scientific output since its introduction in November, 2014. Each year, Nature Index ranks the leading institutions (which can be companies, universities, government agencies, research institutes, or NGOs) and countries by the number of scientific articles and papers published in leading journals. This ranking can also be categorized by individual fields of research such as life sciences, chemistry, physics, or earth sciences, with different institutions leading in each. The Nature Index was conceived by Nature Research. In total, more than 10,000 institutions are listed in the Nature Index.

The Nature Index migrated from its own domain www.natureindex.com to the Nature Portfolio platform (www.nature.com) in July, 2022

Methodology 
The Nature Index attempts to objectively measure the scientific output of institutions and countries, taking into account differences in quality. Therefore, only articles published in 82 selected high-quality journals are counted. These journals are selected by an independent committee. If authors from several institutions and/or countries are involved in a scientific article, it is divided accordingly, assuming that all researchers were equally involved in the article. For example, this “fractional count” (FC) received by each author would be 0.1 for an article with 10 authors. If an author is affiliated with more than one institution, that author’s FC is then subdivided equally across their affiliated institutions. The process is similar for countries and regions, though the fact that some institutions have overseas labs makes the process more complicated, with such labs being counted towards their appropriate host countries.

Top institutions 
The top 25 institutions with the highest share of articles published in scientific journals according to the Nature Index 2022, which is valid for the calendar year 2021:

Top countries 
The top 25 countries with the highest share of articles published in scientific journals according to the Nature Index 2022, which is valid for the calendar year 2021.

Notes

References 

 International rankings
2016 introductions